Jeremy David Hanson, CSC, MLA (born 18 February 1967) is a former Australian Army officer and is an Australian politician with the Liberal Party, elected to the Australian Capital Territory Legislative Assembly as one of seven MLAs for the Molonglo electorate at the 2008 election. He was the Opposition Leader in the ACT, as well as Shadow Minister for Health, Police, Corrections and Indigenous Affairs, between February 2013 and October 2016. In 2016, following a redistricting of the ACT's electorates and an expansion in size of the Legislative Assembly, he was elected as one of five MLAs for the new electorate of Murrumbidgee.

Following the resignation of fellow Murrumbidgee Liberal MLA, Giulia Jones, Hanson was elected as Deputy Leader of the Canberra Liberals in February 2022.

Military career
The son of a Royal Air Force officer who was posted to Canberra in 1979, Hanson completed his schooling in Queensland and joined the Australian Army in 1986; graduating from the Royal Military College Duntroon in 1987. He holds a bachelor's degree from the University of New England and a master's degree in Management and Defence Studies from the University of Canberra. Before his election, Hanson served for 22 years in the Army, reaching the rank of lieutenant colonel.

He was deployed to East Timor and Iraq, and earned the Conspicuous Service Cross for his work at Army headquarters. In addition, Hanson has been awarded the following medals:
ADF Gold Commendation
Australian Active Service Medal with clasps Iraq 2003 and East Timor
Iraq Medal
Defence Long Service Medal with 1st clasp
Defence Medal
United Nations Medal with UNTAET Ribbon
Return from Active Service Badge
Army Combat Badge

Personal life
Hanson has dual British-Australian citizenship.

See also
 2016 Australian Capital Territory general election

References

External links

Liberal Party of Australia members of the Australian Capital Territory Legislative Assembly
1967 births
Living people
Australian Army officers
Members of the Australian Capital Territory Legislative Assembly
People educated at Kimbolton School
Recipients of the Conspicuous Service Cross (Australia)
Place of birth missing (living people)
University of Canberra alumni
University of New England (Australia) alumni
Royal Military College, Duntroon graduates
21st-century Australian politicians